Robert Mouynet (born 25 March 1930 in Toulon) is a former French footballer. He was part of the French squad which finished third at the 1958 FIFA World Cup, but he never won a cap for the France national football team.

Club career
 1954-1959: Olympique Lyonnais
 1959-1961: Toulouse FC

References

1930 births
Living people
French footballers
1958 FIFA World Cup players
Olympique Lyonnais players
Ligue 1 players
Ligue 2 players

Association football defenders